SS Robert Y. Hayne was a Liberty ship built in the United States during World War II. She was named after Robert Y. Hayne, an American lawyer, planter and politician. He served in the United States Senate from 1823 to 1832, as Governor of South Carolina 1832–1834, and as Mayor of Charleston, South Carolina 1836–1837.

Construction
Robert Y. Hayne was laid down on 2 November 1942, under a Maritime Commission (MARCOM) contract, MC hull 1198, by the St. Johns River Shipbuilding Company, Jacksonville, Florida; she was sponsored by Mrs. James C. Merrill, Jr., the wife of a Merrill-Stevens Drydock & Repair Co. official, she was launched on 30 May 1943.

History
She was allocated to Agwilines Inc., on 20 July 1943. On 30 May 1946, she was placed in the Hudson River Reserve Fleet, Jones Point, New York. She was sold for commercial use, on 19 May 1947, to Italy, and renamed Citta Di Savona. She was withdrawn from the fleet, 6 June 1947.

References

Bibliography

 
 
 
 

 

Liberty ships
Ships built in Jacksonville, Florida
1943 ships
Hudson River Reserve Fleet
Liberty ships transferred to Italy